ISO 3166-2:CD is the entry for the Democratic Republic of the Congo in ISO 3166-2, part of the ISO 3166 standard published by the International Organization for Standardization (ISO), which defines codes for the names of the principal subdivisions (e.g., provinces or states) of all countries coded in ISO 3166-1.

Currently for the Democratic Republic of the Congo, ISO 3166-2 codes are defined for 1 city and 25 provinces. The city Kinshasa is the capital of the country and has special status equal to the provinces. 
Each code consists of two parts, separated by a hyphen. The second part is two letters.

Current codes
Subdivision names are listed as in the ISO 3166-2 standard published by the ISO 3166 Maintenance Agency (ISO 3166/MA).

Click on the button in the header to sort each column.

 Notes

Changes
The following changes to the entry have been announced by the ISO 3166/MA since the first publication of ISO 3166-2 in 1998. ISO stopped issuing newsletters in 2013.

See also
 Subdivisions of the Democratic Republic of the Congo
 FIPS region codes of the Democratic Republic of the Congo

References

External links
 ISO Online Browsing Platform: CD
 Provinces of the Democratic Republic of Congo (Congo Kinshasa), Statoids.com

2:CD
ISO 3166-2
Democratic Republic of the Congo geography-related lists